On 22 February 2023, at roughly 8pm local time, two gunmen shot off-duty Detective Chief Inspector John Caldwell in Omagh, Northern Ireland. The gunmen are believed to have been linked to the New IRA.

Six men have been arrested in connection with the shooting.

Background 
Caldwell is known in part for investigating high-profile murder incidents, including the murder of Ronan Kerr and the death of Lyra McKee. He has received multiple death threats in the past.

Events 
John Caldwell coached an under-15s football team at Youth Sports complex in Omagh. At 20:00, following a practice session, Caldwell was loading footballs into his car with his son. Two men approached and opened fire. Caldwell fled, but was hit and fell, with the gunmen continuing to fire at him. According to police, the children fled in "sheer terror".

The gunmen fled in a small car, which was later found burnt out outside Omagh by police.

A member of the public administered first aid. He was then taken to Altnagelvin Hospital in Derry and underwent two surgeries. He remains in critical but stable condition.

Reactions 
The attack was condemned by several political leaders including UK Prime Minister Rishi Sunak, Secretary of State for Northern Ireland Chris Heaton-Harris and Taoiseach Leo Varadkar.

References

Omagh
2023 in Northern Ireland
February 2023 events in the United Kingdom
February 2023 events in Ireland
Attacks in the United Kingdom in 2023